Lowry Burgess (1940 – January 28, 2020) was a conceptual and environmental artist and educator and was a professor at Carnegie Mellon University, where he was a Distinguished Fellow in the STUDIO for Creative Inquiry. He also served on the Advisory Council of METI (Messaging Extraterrestrial Intelligence).

Lowry was educated at the Pennsylvania Academy of the Fine Arts. He continued his studies at the University of Pennsylvania and at the Instituto Allende in San Miguel de Allende, Mexico.

Achievements

After the destruction of the Buddhas in Bamiyan, Afghanistan, in 2001, he authored the "Toronto Manifesto, The Right to Human Memory."  His 1989 piece entitled “Boundless Cubic Lunar Aperture” became the seventh piece of art taken into space by NASA (after the 6 pieces of art in the Moon Museum of 1969). “Vision Flower Portals” are all based upon a flower, but not the same one, for each flower and painting is its own addition to "Quiet Axis." The Quiet Axis is a visionary realignment of the earth and heavens so that new relationships may be ordered to establish a new framework for consciousness. Each aspect of the Quiet Axis searches for the soul of the world wherein it is neither object nor belief — where darkness and light are one eternal presence.

He received awards from the American Academy of Arts and Letters, the National Institute of Arts and Letters, the Guggenheim Foundation, the Rockefeller Foundation, the National Endowment for the Arts, the Massachusetts Artists Foundation, the Kellogg Foundation and the Berkmann Fund. His artwork can be found in museums and archives in many countries; especially those that focus on art and science.

References

Carnegie Mellon University faculty
Environmental artists
1940 births
2020 deaths
University of Pennsylvania alumni
Instituto Allende alumni
American expatriates in Mexico